The 2020–21 winter transfer window for Italian football transfers opened on 2 January and closed on 31 January. Additionally, players without a club could join at any time. This list includes transfers featuring at least one Serie A or Serie B club which were completed after the end of the summer 2020 transfer window on 5 October 2020 and before the end of the 2020–21 winter window.

Transfers
Legend
Those clubs in Italic indicate that the player already left the team on loan on this or the previous season or new signing that immediately left the club.

Footnotes

References

Italy
2020-21
Winter transfers